Bighorn Mountain, or He Sha, is located in Banner County, about  east of the county seat of Harrisburg, in the Wildcat Hills of Nebraska, United States.

The peak was named for the bighorn sheep that once roamed its flanks, and were reintroduced in the 1970s.

Many residents of the county have carved their names at the top of the peak; the practice dates back at least to 1887.

See also
Mountain peaks of North America

References

Landforms of Banner County, Nebraska
Mountains of Nebraska